Banchan or bansang are small side dishes served along with cooked rice in Korean cuisine. As the Korean language does not distinguish between singular and plural grammatically, the word is used for both one such dish or all of them combined.

The basic table setting for a meal called bansang (반상) usually consists of bap (밥, cooked rice), guk or tang (soup), gochujang or ganjang, jjigae, and kimchi. According to the number of banchan added, the table setting is called 3 cheop (삼첩), 5 cheop (오첩), 7 cheop (칠첩), 9 cheop (구첩), 12 cheop (십이첩) bansang, with the 12 cheop used in Korean royal cuisine.

Banchan are set in the middle of the table to be shared. At the center of the table is the secondary main course, such as galbi or bulgogi, and a shared pot of jjigae. Bowls of cooked rice and guk (soup) are set individually. Banchan are served in small portions, meant to be finished at each meal and replenished during the meal if not enough. Usually, the more formal the meals are, the more banchan there will be. Jeolla province is particularly famous for serving many different varieties of banchan in a single meal.

While the countries surrounding Korea were preserving foods with their abundance of livestock resources, Korea was forced to utilize another way to safeguard their resources. Due to their focus on agriculture, the main ingredients in their fermented foods were grains and vegetables. The fermentation process is necessary as most parts of the Korean peninsula are isolated by mountains from all sides. Additionally, this process of fermentation can be used to enrich the flavor profile of food with the use of gochujang. Kimchi is a perfect example of this enriched food utilizing the flavor and fermentation process together. Therefore, banchan is mainly seasoned with fermented soy products, medicinal herbs, and sesame or perilla oils.

Gochujang was added to enhance each meal. Potentially, this could refer to another chojang (vinegar sauce) that was used as a dipping sauce. Mustard was an additional important seasoning used to enrich the flavor of the foods. Chojang was made by mixing gochujang with honey, vinegar, and ground pine nuts. It was made by adding mustard powder or whole mustard to water and grinding it out, then adding vinegar, salt and sugar and leaving the mixture upside down in a warm place.

For the fermentation of vegetables jangkwa (pickled vegetables and fruit) were served. These dishes were created by pickling the different seasonal vegetables with kanjang, gochujang, and doenjang. However, in the palace, jangkwa also referred to a dish made by pickling cucumber, radish, young radish, parsley, or cabbage heart with salt, then drying it in the sun, removing all moisture; the vegetables were then stir-fried with beef, shredded red pepper, sesame oil, and sesame and salt.

History
Banchan is thought to be a result of Buddhist influence at around the mid-Three Kingdoms period and the subsequent proscription against eating meat by the monarchies of these kingdoms. Thus, with the ban on meat-containing dishes, vegetable-based dishes rose in prominence and became the focal point of Korean cuisine; court kitchens developed various methods for cooking, preparing and presenting these dishes, while less-affluent commoners produced smaller, simpler arrays of these vegetable-based dishes.

Although the Mongol invasions of Korea ended the ban on meat-containing dishes, as well as meat offerings for rituals such as jesa, approximately six centuries of vegetable-based cuisine in the form of banchan had imprinted itself into Korean cuisine.

During the Joseon Dynasty, Buddhism was shunned while Confucianism remained the dominant ideology that was followed. Tea was no longer served in the palace and slowly began to dwindle, however, the ceremony of tea and rice cakes as snacks endured. Through food, the Joseon kings were able to see the living conditions of their people.  ‘Accordingly, royal cuisine in the final period of the Joseon Dynasty was borne out of a culture of restraint based on Confucian ideology, but experienced changes after the 18th century as taste and personal preference became more dominant values’ (Chung et al., 2017). ‘The Korean Empire was also influenced by foreign cuisine, and western-style banquets were held in Deoksugung (德壽宮) Palace. King Kojong is known to have been a fan of coffee. As Emperor Sunjong took the throne, royal cuisine was introduced to the common people through royal chefs and cooks’ (Chung et al., 2017).
In the olden days, it is believed that the 12 banchan setting was for people with a higher ranking such as the king or emperor while the rest of the nobel family members will have a maximum of 9 banchan served. The different banchan setting was used to distinguish the power and hierarchy between the royals.

Varieties

Kimchi

Kimchi is a popular banchan which requires vegetables to undergo a fermentation process with different korean spices. Kimchi is high in dietary fiber and low in calories, but is also high in many different nutrients that can be beneficial for the body. Through the fermentation process, Kimchi produces high levels of Vitamins such as Vitamin and Vitamin B complex and minerals that are very beneficial for the body.

Kimchi is fermented vegetables, usually baechu (Napa cabbage), seasoned with chili peppers and salt. This is the essential banchan of a standard Korean meal. Some Koreans do not consider a meal complete without kimchi. Kimchi can be made with other vegetables as well, including scallions, gat (갓), and radish (무; mu).

Namul

Namul (나물) refers to steamed, marinated, or stir-fried vegetables usually seasoned with sesame oil, salt, vinegar, minced garlic, chopped green onions, dried chili peppers, and soy sauce.

Bokkeum
Bokkeum (볶음) is a dish stir-fried with sauce.
Kimchi bokkeum (김치볶음) - Stir-fried kimchi, often with pork (similar to jeyook bokkeum).
Jeyook bokkeum (제육볶음) - Stir-fried pork with gochujang (chili pepper paste) sauce and onions.
Ojingeochae bokkeum (오징어채볶음) — Stir-fried dried shredded squid seasoned with a mixture of gochujang (chili pepper paste), garlic, and mullyeot (syrup-like condiment).
Nakji bokkeum (낙지볶음) - Stir-fried baby octopus in spicy gochujang sauce.
Buseot bokkeum (버섯볶음) - Stir-fried mushrooms such as pyogo, oyster mushrooms, pine mushrooms.
Myulchi bokkeum - Stir-fried dried anchovies.

Jorim
Jorim is a dish simmered in a seasoned broth.
Dubu-jorim (두부조림) — Tofu simmered in diluted soy sauce, a little bit of sesame oil, minced garlic, and chopped green onion.
Jang-jorim (장조림) — Beef simmered in soy sauce, optionally with hard-boiled eggs or hard-boiled quail eggs.

Jjim
Jjim is a steamed dish.
Gyeran-jjim (계란찜) — Mixed and seasoned eggs steamed in a hot pot. 
Saengseon jjim (생선찜)- Steamed fish.

Jeon
Jeon denotes a variety of pan-fried, pancake-like dishes. Buchimgae is a near synonym. 
Pajeon (파전) — Thin pancakes with scallions.
Kimchijeon (김치전) — Thin pancakes with old (ripe) Kimchi.
Gamjajeon (감자전) — Korean-style potato pancakes. 
Saengseon-jeon (생선전) — Small portions of fish coated with eggs and pan-fried.
Donggeurang ttaeng (동그랑땡) — Patty made with tofu, meat and vegetables, coated with eggs and pan-fried.
Yukjeon (육전) — Bite-sized beef coated in flour and egg and grilled in a pan.

Others
Danmuji (단무지) — A pickled radish marinated in a natural yellow dye made from gardenia fruit.
Gyeran-mari (계란말이) — A rolled omelet served in slices.
Japchae (잡채) — A stand-alone dish in its own right, japchae can also be eaten as banchan. Japchae is glass noodles accompanied with a variety of vegetables and beef in a slightly-sweet garlic sauce.
Korean-style potato salad (감자 샐러드) with apples and carrots.

Gallery

See also 
 Korean table d'hôte
 Okazu
 Meze
 Smörgåsbord
 Thali

References

External links

Introduction to Korean Food
About Korean Cuisine 
 The characteristics of Korean food

 
Appetizers
Korean cuisine
Serving and dining
Meals